The 2016 UNAF U-17 Tournament was the 13th edition of the UNAF U-17 Tournament. The tournament took place in Rabat, Morocco, from May 28 to June 4, 2016.

Participants

 (hosts)

 (invited)

Venue
Maamora sports centre, Salé

Group stage
All times are local UTC+1.

Group A

Group B

Final stage

Champions

References

2016 in African football
2016
2016